Augustus Smith may refer to:

Augustus L. Smith (1833–1902), American politician and businessman
Augustus Smith (politician) (1804–1872), British politician and governor of the Isles of Scilly
Augustus Smith (priest) (1844–1916), Barbadian cricketer and Anglican priest
Augustus William Smith (1802–1866), educator, astronomer and mathematician
A. Ledyard Smith (1901–1985), American archaeologist 
J. Augustus Smith (1891–?), American actor, playwright, and screenwriter

See also
August E. Smith (1879–1969), American politician and educator